Amity University is a private university located in Patna, India. The university was established in 2017 by the Amity Education Group through the Bihar Private University (Amendment) Bill, 2017. It offers various undergraduate and postgraduate courses. The university additionally operates Amity Global Business School in Patna.

Campus
Amity University Patna’s campus is located at Rupaspur on Bailey Road, Patna.

See also
 List of educational institutions in Patna

References

External links

Universities in Bihar
Universities and colleges in Patna
Educational institutions established in 2017
2017 establishments in Bihar
Private universities in India